Bill Tilley (born 14 September 1938) is an Australian water polo player. He competed in the men's tournament at the 1972 Summer Olympics.

See also
 Australia men's Olympic water polo team records and statistics
 List of men's Olympic water polo tournament goalkeepers

References

External links
 

1938 births
Living people
Australian male water polo players
Water polo goalkeepers
Olympic water polo players of Australia
Water polo players at the 1972 Summer Olympics
Place of birth missing (living people)